Ericameria watsonii, or Watson's goldenbush, is a North American species of flowering shrubs from the family Asteraceae. It is native to the states of Nevada, Utah, and Arizona in the southwestern United States.

Ericameria watsonii is a branching shrub up to 40 cm (16 inches) tall, the stems green when young but become reddish-brown as they get old. Flower heads are yellow, with both ray florets and disc florets. It grows in desert scrublands, rocky slopes, and open pine woodlands.

References

External links

watsonii
Flora of Arizona
Flora of Nevada
Flora of Utah
Endemic flora of the United States
Plants described in 1880
Taxa named by Asa Gray
Flora without expected TNC conservation status